Qarun may refer to:
 Korah, a biblical reference
 Qarun, Iran, a village in Kerman Province, Iran
 Birket Qarun, a saltwater lake in Egypt, formerly known as Lake Moeris.